Northwestern or North-western or North western may refer to:
 Northwest, a direction
 Northwestern University, a private research university in Evanston, Illinois
 The Northwestern Wildcats, this school's intercollegiate athletic program
 Northwestern Medicine, an academic medical system comprising:
 Northwestern University Feinberg School of Medicine
 Northwestern Memorial Hospital.

Other colleges and universities
 Northwestern College (Iowa), a small Christian college in Iowa
 University of Northwestern – St. Paul (formerly Northwestern College), a small Christian college, located in Roseville, Minnesota
 The former Northwestern College in Watertown, Wisconsin, which was incorporated into Martin Luther College in New Ulm, Minnesota in 1995
 Northwestern Michigan College, a small college located in Traverse City, Michigan
 Northwestern Oklahoma State University in Alva, Oklahoma
 Northwestern State University, in Natchitoches, Louisiana
 Northwestern California University School of Law, an online based law school in Sacramento, California
 Northwestern Polytechnic University in Fremont, California

Other schools
 Northwestern High School (disambiguation), a number of high schools in the United States

Geographic areas
 Northwestern United States, a region of the United States of America
 North Western Oklahoma City, a district of Oklahoma City around Western Avenue 
 North West Province, South Africa, a province of South Africa
 North Western Province, Sri Lanka, a province of Sri Lanka
 North-Western Province, Zambia, one of Zambia's ten provinces
 Northwestern Federal District, Russia
 Northwestern Krai, a subdivision of Imperial Russia
 North-Western Territory, a Hudson's Bay Company region, precursor to today's Northwest Territories though including what is now Yukon Territory
 North-Western Provinces, an administrative region in British India

Other
 Northwestern Memorial Hospital, a nationally ranked academic medical center in Chicago, Illinois
 Northwestern Station in Chicago, Illinois
 The Chicago and North Western Railway
 The Oshkosh Northwestern, a daily newspaper based in Oshkosh, Wisconsin
 FV Northwestern crab fishing vessel featured on Deadliest Catch
 The Northwestern (band), a British rock band
 Northwestern (genre), a genre of literature and film depicting Westerns set in Canada and Alaska
 North Western Road Car Company (1923), the historic 1923-1974 bus company based in Stockport, England
 North Western Road Car Company (1986), the historic 1986-1997 bus company based in Liverpool, England
 North Western Railway (disambiguation)

See also
Northwest (disambiguation)